Southerland Mountain is a summit located in Adirondack Mountains of New York located in the town of Hope northwest of the hamlet of the same name.

References

Mountains of Hamilton County, New York
Mountains of New York (state)